Sir Henry Gray Studholme, 1st Baronet CVO DL (13 June 1899 – 9 October 1987) was a British Conservative Party politician.

Early life
Studholme was the son of landowner William Paul Studholme and a grandson of New Zealand pioneer and politician John Studholme. He was educated at Eton College and Magdalen College, Oxford and served as an officer in the Scots Guards.

Parliament
Studholme was Member of Parliament (MP) for Tavistock from a 1942 by-election until his retirement in 1966, when he was succeeded by Michael Heseltine. He served under Winston Churchill and then Anthony Eden as Vice-Chamberlain of the Household (i.e. a whip) from 1951 to 1956. In 1956, he was created a Baronet of Perridge in the County of Devon. He was Joint Honorary Treasury of the Conservative Party from 1956 to 1962.

Michael Crick comments that his position as a whip suited him as he was "an appalling speaker" (whips by convention seldom speak in debates in the Commons), although he was considered a diligent constituency MP.

Family
Studholme married Judith Joan Mary Whitbread, daughter of Henry William Whitbread and granddaughter of Samuel Whitbread, in 1929. He died in October 1987, aged 88, and was succeeded in the baronetcy by his son Paul.

He later served as a deputy lieutenant of Devon in 1969.

References

Kidd, Charles, Williamson, David (editors). Debrett's Peerage and Baronetage (1990 edition). New York: St Martin's Press, 1990, 

 Michael Crick, Michael Heseltine: A Biography, Hamish Hamilton, 1997, .

External links 
 

1899 births
1987 deaths
People educated at Eton College
Alumni of Magdalen College, Oxford
Studholme, Sir Henry 1st Baronet
Commanders of the Royal Victorian Order
Conservative Party (UK) MPs for English constituencies
Deputy Lieutenants of Devon
UK MPs 1935–1945
UK MPs 1945–1950
UK MPs 1950–1951
UK MPs 1951–1955
UK MPs 1955–1959
UK MPs 1959–1964
UK MPs 1964–1966
Members of London County Council
Members of the Parliament of the United Kingdom for Tavistock
Ministers in the third Churchill government, 1951–1955
Ministers in the Eden government, 1955–1957
Moorhouse–Rhodes family